

Lac de la Bayenna is a mountain lake in the Val de Moiry, a side valley of the Val d'Anniviers, on the territory of the municipality of Anniviers in the Swiss canton of Valais. Its outlet flows into the Gougra river after about 800 m slightly below Lac de Châteaupré.

Accessibility 
The lake can be reached on a mountain hiking trail in about 30 minutes from Lac de Châteaupré, which is accessible by public transport.

Lac de la Bayenna is located on the circular hiking trail around Lac de Moiry (Tour du Lac de Moiry). In addition, the mountain trail to the mountain pass Col du Tsaté, a crossing into the Val d'Hérens, passes the lake.

References 

Bayenna